Tuban Regency is a regency in East Java province of Indonesia. The Dutch name of the regency is 'Toeban'. It covers an area of 1,839.94 sq. km, and had a population of 1,118,464 at the 2010 Census and 1,198,012 at the 2020 Census. The administrative centre is the town of Tuban. The regency is located in a strategic area, on the border of East Java with Central Java, passed by the main highway (Jalan Nasional Daendels) along the north coast of Java (Pantura). In ancient times, Tuban was the main port of Majapahit and was a center of Islamic spreading by Walisongo.

Administrative districts 
Tuban Regency consists of twenty districts (kecamatan), tabulated below with their areas and population totals from the 2010 Census and the 2020 Census. The table also includes the number of administrative villages (rural desa and urban kelurahan) in each district, and its postal codes.

References